Samuel William Hinzman (October 24, 1936 – February 5, 2012) was an American actor and film director.

Hinzman's first role was the cemetery zombie in the popular horror film Night of the Living Dead (1968). He reprised the role in new scenes that were filmed for the 30th-anniversary edition of the film. Hinzman also played roles in the films Legion of the Night (1995), Santa Claws (1996), Evil Ambitions (1996), and The Drunken Dead Guy (2005).

His final role was in River of Darkness, where he played a lead role alongside Kurt Angle, Kevin Nash and Sid Eudy.

He later directed the films The Majorettes (1986), and Flesheater (1988).

His name is spelled "Heinzman" in the original Night of the Living Dead credits.

During filming of Night of the Living Dead, crew member Gary Streiner accidentally caught himself on fire while attempting to ignite a prop with gasoline. Bill Hinzman managed to put out the fire, saving Streiner's life.

Death
Hinzman died on February 5, 2012, from cancer. His death occurred the same day as that of Josephine Streiner (1918–2012), a crew member who played a zombie in Night of the Living Dead.

Filmography

References

External links

1930 births
2012 deaths
Male actors from Pittsburgh
American male film actors
People from Coraopolis, Pennsylvania
Deaths from cancer in Pennsylvania
Film directors from Pennsylvania
American people of German descent